Fleet Street Publisher was an Atari ST desktop publishing program produced by Mirrorsoft in the United Kingdom and released in November 1986. A IBM PC compatible version produced by Rowan Software was planned for 1987 but never released.

Running under GEM the program offered features such as multi-column text, the ability to design flow charts and graphics and multiple document sizes (flyers, menus, cards, etc.). Possible font sizes ranged from 4 to 216 points with support for accented characters. Character and line spacing where fully controllable by the user. The software came with a 150 image clipart gallery.

The software was superseded by Timeworks Publisher (Publish-It in the United States), which the market regarded as a much better product. This new version was produced by GST Software Products, and upgrades for the PC versions were available into the late 2000s.

Versions
Fleet Street Publisher (1986, published by Spectrum Holobyte and France Image Logiciel) 
Fleet Street Publisher 1.1 (1987, published by Mirrorsoft)
Fleet Street Publisher 2.0 (1989, published by MichTron) 
Fleet Street Publisher 3.0 (1989, published by MichTron)

References

External links
 Icwhen.com

Atari ST software
Desktop publishing software